Little Fish, Strange Pond (alternate titled as Frenemy) is a 2009 direct-to-DVD independent black comedy drama film directed by Gregory Dark and written by Robert Dean Klein.

Cast
Matthew Modine as Mr. Jack
Callum Blue as Sweet Stephen
Paul Adelstein as Philly
Adam Baldwin as Tommy
Zach Galifianakis as Bucky
Don McManus as Dennis Rivers
Liza Weil as Norma
Lisa Brenner as Juliet
David Ellison as Romeo

Release 
The film was initially released under the title Little Fish, Strange Pond and it premiered at the Hollywood Film Festival on October 23, 2009. The film was later retitled Frenemy for its DVD release on December 14, 2010. That release was known for prominently featuring Zack Galifianakis on the cover with a poor overall photo manipulation after his success with The Hangover, though he wasn't even highlighted as a star of the film below Modine and Blue when it was released originally, and only played a small role within it.

Reception 
The Austin American-Statesman reviewed the film, noting that the film tried to be too many things at once but was instead "sour incoherence". DVD Talk also reviewed it, writing "As a weird comedy/morality play involving gruesome murder, Frenemy will test your limits of appreciation for clever structure and kegger philosophy, as forcefully as it pushes your buttons with unlikable characters."

References

External links
 
 

2009 films
American independent films
Films set in Los Angeles
Films shot in Los Angeles
2009 comedy-drama films
American comedy-drama films
Films directed by Gregory Dark
2009 comedy films
2009 drama films
2009 independent films
2000s English-language films
2000s American films